Iceland was represented at the Eurovision Song Contest 1989 by Daníel Ágúst Haraldsson with the song "Það sem enginn sér". Ágúst was the winner of the Icelandic national final, Söngvakeppni Sjónvarpsins 1989, organised by Icelandic broadcaster Ríkisútvarpið (RÚV).

Before Eurovision

Söngvakeppni Sjónvarpsins 1989 
The final was held on 30 March 1989 at the RÚV studios in Reykjavík, hosted by Jónas R. Jónsson. 5 songs competed, which were all shown as pre-recorded video clips, and the winner was chosen by the votes of 8 regional juries.

At Eurovision 
Ágúst performed 20th on the night of the contest, held in Lausanne, Switzerland, following Greece and preceding Germany. Iceland did not manage to receive any points from all countries, placing 22nd (last) of 22 competing countries. The Icelandic jury awarded its 12 points to Cyprus.

Voting 
Iceland did not receive any points at the 1989 Eurovision Song Contest.

References

External links 
Icelandic National Final 1989

1989
Countries in the Eurovision Song Contest 1989
Eurovision